Lipinia is a genus of skinks, lizards in the family Scincidae. Species in the genus Lipinia are commonly called lipinias.

Taxonomy
The genus Lipinia belongs to the Sphenomorphus group of genera in which Lipinia has a rather basal position (Austin & Arnold 2006).

Species
The following species are recognized as being valid.

Lipinia auriculata  – Taylor's lipinia
Lipinia cheesmanae  – Cheesman's lipinia, Cheesman's moth skink
Lipinia inconspicua  – hidden ground skink
Lipinia inexpectata 
Lipinia infralineolata 
Lipinia leptosoma  – slender lipinia, Pandanus skink
Lipinia longiceps  – long lipinia
Lipinia macrotympanum  – big-eared lipinia
Lipinia miangensis  – Werner's lipinia
Lipinia microcerca  – banded lipinia, Sipora striped skink, common striped skink
Lipinia nitens 
Lipinia occidentalis 
Lipinia pulchella  – yellow-striped slender tree skink, beautiful lipinia
Lipinia quadrivittata  – four-striped lipinia, black-striped slender tree skink
Lipinia rabori  – Rabor's lipinia, black slender tree skink 
Lipinia relicta  – Vinciguerra's lipinia
Lipinia rouxi  – Roux's lipinia
Lipinia sekayuensis  – Sekayu striped skink
Lipinia semperi  – Semper's lipinia
Lipinia septentrionalis 
Lipinia subvittata  – striped lipinia
Lipinia surda  – Malaysian striped skink
Lipinia trivittata 
Lipinia vassilievi 
Lipinia venemai  – Brongersma's lipinia
Lipinia vittigera  – banded lipinia, Sipora striped skink, common striped skink
Lipinia vulcania  – vulcan lipinia
Lipinia zamboangensis  – Zamboang lipinia, rusty tree skink

Nota bene: A binomial authority in parentheses indicates that the species was originally described in a genus other than Lipinia.

References

Further reading
 (1845). Catalogue of the Specimens of Lizards in the Collection of the British Museum. London: Trustees of the British Museum. (Edward Newman, printer). xxviii + 289 pp. (Lipinia, new genus, p. 84).

External links
 (2006). Using ancient and recent DNA to explore relationships of extinct and endangered Leiolopisma skinks (Reptilia: Scincidae) in the Mascarene islands. Molecular Phylogenetics and Evolution 39 (2): 503–511.  (HTML abstract)

Lipinia
Lizard genera
Taxa named by John Edward Gray